Kallang MRT station is an above-ground Mass Rapid Transit (MRT) station on the East West line in Kallang, Singapore. It is located next to the Kallang River and along Sims Avenue at the junction of Lorong 1 Geylang. Kallang station served as the nearest MRT station to the National Stadium and Singapore Indoor Stadium (now part of the Singapore Sports Hub), until Stadium MRT station on the Circle line opened on 17 April 2010. However, the station is still linked to the Singapore Sports Hub via a sheltered walkway.

Kallang station is the last above-ground station on the eastern section of the East West line for trains travelling westwards. The Lorong 1 Geylang bus terminal is located across the station.

History

On 8 November 1985, Lee Kim Tah was awarded the MRT civil contract for Kallang, Aljunied and Paya Lebar stations under Contract 302 and 303, including the viaducts from Kallang portal to Paya Lebar MRT station.

On 28 December 2005, a 32-year-old Indian man died within minutes after he fell onto the tracks and was subsequently hit by an oncoming west-bound train. The incident occurred at about 3 pm and disrupted train services heading towards Boon Lay for 50 minutes. 4000 passengers had their trips disrupted. The man is believed to have jumped to his death.

On 14 October 2011, some 6,500 commuters were affected by a train delay along the East West line on Friday evening. An SMRT spokesperson said a westbound train at Kallang encountered a train fault and had to be taken out of service at 5.50 pm. Westbound train service between Kallang and Bugis were disrupted for 20 minutes. Trains were turned around at Bugis and Eunos.

As with most of the above-ground stations along the East West line, it was built without platform screen doors. Installation of half-height platform screen doors, to prevent commuters from falling onto the train tracks, was started on 19 December 2010 and started operation on 25 February 2011 with Kembangan. This station is fitted with high-volume low-speed fans, which have been operating since 28 July 2012.

On 25 February 2021, a 31-year-old man died after intruding into the track and was hit by the oncoming east-bound train at around 9pm. The incident took place near a train tunnel 150 metres away from the station and disrupting train services between Bugis and Aljunied from 9pm until end of the service.

References

External links

 

Railway stations in Singapore opened in 1989
Kallang
Mass Rapid Transit (Singapore) stations